Hakim Khan Sur  An ethnic Pashtun, (also known as Hakim Khan Sur Pashtun) was a descendant of Sher Shah Suri and a general in Rana Pratap's army. He fought with him in the Battle of Haldighati and died in 1576. In Haldighati Battle, he commanded an army of Afghans who were against the rising power of Mughal Empire.

Biography

Hakim Khan Suri was a member of the Suri dynasty and was a descendant of Sher Shah Suri (the founder of the Suri Empire).

Hakim Khan was a seasoned Suri, who had his own axe to grind against the imperial motives of the Mughals. He found in Pratap an energetic, chivalrous and bold veteran hero, for whom the Mughal imperialism was a nuisance too.

The Battle of Haldighati is widely but wrongly perceived as a Hindu-Muslim conflict, but this is not the case. Both armies had a mix of Hindus and Muslims. This was a struggle between the Mughal imperialism and Mewar. Whereas Hakim Khan Suri led the vanguard for Rana Pratap, Akbar's army was commanded by the Rajput chief of Jaipur, Man Singh I and half the Mughal army was composed of Rajput soldiers. Hakim Khan was part of the battle to exact revenge from the Mughals for the defeat of Sikandar Shah Suri, his forefather.

Legacy
Hakim Khan Suri occupies a high place in the annals of Mewar and an award of the Maharana Mewar Foundation bears his name. Hakim Khan Sur Award goes is given by the foundation to people for outstanding achievement and service to the nation. Every year a commemorative festival is held at Haldighati where his memorial is located.

In Popular Culture
2013–2015: Bharat Ka Veer Putra – Maharana Pratap, broadcast by Sony Entertainment Television (India), where he was portrayed by Nirbhay Wadhwa.

References

History of Rajasthan
Maharana Pratap
16th-century Afghan people
1576 deaths